Events from the year 1764 in France.

Incumbents 
Monarch: Louis XV

Events
 The government withdraws wartime taxes.
 Beast of Gévaudan first appears.

Births
 11 February – Joseph Chénier, poet  (d. 1811)
 13 April – Laurent de Gouvion Saint-Cyr, marshal (d. 1830)
 26 April – Claude-Laurent Bourgeois de Jessaint, aristocrat and civic administrator (d. 1853)
 3 May – Princess Élisabeth of France, sister of Louis XVI (executed 1794)
 13 August – Louis Baraguey d'Hilliers, general (d. 1813)
 7 December
 Pierre Prévost, panorama painter (d. 1823)
 Claude Victor-Perrin, Duc de Belluno, Marshal of France (d. 1841)
 Undated – Sophie de Condorcet, political hostess and feminist (d. 1822)

Deaths
 15 April – Madame de Pompadour, mistress of Louis XV (b. 1721)
 11 September – Countess Dash, writer (born 1704)
 12 September – Jean-Philippe Rameau, composer (b. 1683)
 22 October – Jean-Marie Leclair, composer and violinist (murdered) (b. 1697)
 23 October – Emmanuel-Auguste de Cahideuc, Comte Dubois de la Motte, naval officer (b. 1683)

See also

References

1760s in France